Ruth Maxon Adams (1883–1970) was an American architect.

Biography 

Adams grew up in New Haven, Connecticut, the only child of Yale professor George Burton Adams. As a child, she visited England with her father, where she was first exposed to William Morris and the Arts and Crafts movement. She graduated from Vassar College in 1904, with no intention of practicing architecture.

Six years later, she enrolled in the New York School of Applied Design for Women to study interior design. Adams received commissions from Vassar to remodel several campus buildings in 1914. The following year she decided to open her own interior design firm in New York City. During that first year, she received a commission to design a house for two Vassar professors, Edith Fahnestock and Rose Peebles. Adams would go on to design at least six Vassar residences over the course of forty years. Their architectural styles varied, including medieval, Tudor, and neoclassical architecture. She also served as a design consultant for Vassar until 1942. In this position she compiled annual inventories of all of the buildings owned by the college.

In 1921, Adams became the architect for Yelping Hill in West Cornwall, Connecticut. Yelping Hill is a private community started by Henry Seidel Canby, Lee Wilson Dodd, Beverly Waugh Kunkel, Henry Noble MacCracken, David Stanley Smith, and Mason Trowbridge with their wives and children, and served as a summer community in the spirit of the Quaker camps in the Poconos. Adams designed all the residences, co-planned the community, and served as a construction foreman. The houses had no kitchens, as all dining took place in a communal dining room. Childcare was also a community task. These concepts and executions by Adams are considered by architecture historians to be an expression of Adams' feminist ideals. Despite focusing on architecture, Adams described herself as a "designer," rather than an architect.

Legacy

Adams' achievements are located in the collection of the Vassar College archives. The records pertaining to her work with Yelping Hill are held by the Yelping Hill Association Archives.

References

1883 births
1970 deaths
20th-century American architects
American interior designers
Architects from New Haven, Connecticut
Architects from New York City
Berkshires
People from Cornwall, Connecticut
Artists from New Haven, Connecticut
American women architects
Vassar College alumni
Vassar College faculty
American women interior designers
New York School of Applied Design for Women alumni
20th-century American women
American women academics